Maarten de Jonge (born 9 March 1985) is a Dutch former professional cyclist, who rode professionally for ten teams during his career. He claims to have attempted to fly on both Malaysia Airlines Flight 370 and Malaysia Airlines Flight 17, but changed flights in order to save money. 

It has never been independently confirmed that de Jonge ever booked tickets for either flight. According to Slate, de Jonge only mentioned he wanted to fly on the day MH17 crashed, but he never mentioned that he booked a ticket for that flight. Slate also mentioned that there was no reason for de Jonge to book a flight on MH370.

Major results

2008
 3rd Internationale Wielertrofee Jong Maar Moedig
 5th Overall Tour des Pyrénées
2010
 3rd Overall Flèche du Sud
2011
 8th Neuseen Classics
2012
 4th Overall Tour de Serbie
2014
 1st Stage 4 Tour of Thailand

References

External links

1985 births
Living people
Dutch male cyclists
People from Oldenzaal
Cyclists from Overijssel